Mylius is a surname. Notable people with the surname include:

 Edward Mylius (1878–1947), Belgian-born journalist jailed in England in 1911 for libel against King George V
 Helmut Mylius, German industrialist
 Johan Caspar Mylius (1776–1852), Danish military officer and landowner
 Johann Daniel Mylius (c. 1583 – 1642), German composer for the lute, and writer on alchemy
 Jørgen de Mylius (born 1946), Danish radio and TV personality
 Klaus Mylius (born 1930), German indologist
 Mario Mylius (1912–1980), Swiss equestrian
 Ludvig Mylius-Erichsen (1872–1907), Danish author, ethnologist, and explorer

Other uses
 Mylius, a son of Priam, King of Troy
 Mylius, the corporate font of British Airways
 Mylius Aircraft, a manufacturer of airplanes
 Mylius Prize, an Italian prize for painting awarded 1841–1939
 Mylius–Eaton House, a historic building in Sioux City, Iowa, United States
 Mylius-Erichsen Land, a peninsula in northeastern Greenland

See also